Wreck of the Hesperus is an Irish doom metal band based in Dublin. The band first played together in January 2004 and they recorded their first demo, a four-track effort entitled Terminal Dirge in June 2004. The follow-up Eulogy for the Sewer Dwellers was released in 2005. 

The band released their first full-length album The Sunken Threshold in October 2006. The band's website reports that split albums with Irish doom metal bands Mourning Beloveth and De Novissimus are in the pipeline, with the former to be expected in 2007.

July 2011 saw the release of the band's second album, Light Rotting Out.

Band members
 Andy Cunningham – guitar, vocals
 Count Rodge – bass
 Rmongo – drums

Discography
 Terminal Dirge (2004)
 Eulogy for the Sewer Dwellers (2005)
 The Sunken Threshold (2006)
 The Dilapidated Sky (2008)
 Rotism (2008)
 De Novissimis/Wreck of the Hesperus split 10" (2008)
 Mourning Beloveth/Wreck of the Hesperus split 10" (2009)
 Dungeon Floor (2010)
 Light Rotting Out (2011)
 Terminal Eulogy (2012)
 Long Streak of Misery (2014)
 Sediment (2016)

Irish doom metal musical groups
Irish heavy metal musical groups
Musical groups established in 2004
Irish musical trios
Funeral doom musical groups